Defending champion Peter Norfolk defeated David Wagner in the final, 6–3, 3–6, 6–3 to win the quad singles wheelchair tennis title at the 2009 US Open.

The event was not held in 2008 due to a schedule conflict with the 2008 Summer Paralympics, an issue that would continue to affect US Open wheelchair tennis until 2021.

Draw

Final

Round robin
Standings are determined by: 1. number of wins; 2. number of matches; 3. in two-players-ties, head-to-head records; 4. in three-players-ties, percentage of sets won, or of games won; 5. steering-committee decision.

References 
 Draw

Wheelchair Quad Singles
U.S. Open, 2009 Quad Singles